The Little Finlandia Prize is a Finnish literary prize which recognizes outstanding essays on Finnish and world literature written by upper secondary school students. It is administered by the Finnish Language Teachers’ Union in cooperation with the Finnish Book Foundation. The prize was first awarded in 1984.

The winner is announced annually at the Helsinki Book Fair. Each recipient receives a monetary award, a diploma, and the works nominated for the Finlandia Prize in Fiction of the year.

Finalists and winners

References 

Finnish literary awards
Non-fiction literary awards
Awards established in 1984
1984 establishments in Finland